Yvon Bilodeau (born January 18, 1951) is a Canadian former professional ice hockey player. He played in four WHA games with the Calgary Cowboys during the 1975–76 season.

Personal
His younger brother Bob Bilodeau was a 1973 draft pick of the Atlanta Flames.

References

External links

1951 births
Living people
Calgary Cowboys players
Canadian ice hockey defencemen
Charlotte Checkers (EHL) players
Dallas Black Hawks players
Dayton Gems players
Des Moines Capitols players
Estevan Bruins players
Ice hockey people from Alberta
People from Westlock County
Philadelphia Flyers draft picks
Richmond Robins players
San Diego Gulls (WHL) players